The Cheyenne Tornado is a 1935 American Western film directed by William A. O'Connor and starring Reb Russell, Victoria Vinton and Roger Williams.

Cast
 Reb Russell as Red - Cheyenne Kid
 Victoria Vinton as Jane Darnell
 Roger Williams as Clem
 Edmund Cobb as Pete Lang
 Tina Menard as Rita Farley
 Winton Perry as Jim Darnell 
 Dick Botiller as Filipe
 Ed Porter as James Farley
 Hank Bell as Sheriff 
 Lafe McKee as Seth Darnell 
 Rebel as The Kid's Horse

References

Bibliography
 Pitts, Michael R. Poverty Row Studios, 1929-1940. McFarland & Company, 2005.

External links
 

1935 films
1935 Western (genre) films
American Western (genre) films
Films directed by William A. O'Connor
1930s English-language films
1930s American films